In Greek mythology, Astris (Ancient Greek: Ἀστρὶς) or Asteria was, in Nonnus's Dionysiaca,  one of the Heliades, daughters of Helios, either by the Oceanid Clymene or the Oceanid Ceto. She married the river god Hydaspes (the modern Jhelum River) and became mother of Deriades, king in India.

Other uses
The third stage of the ELDO Europa rocket was named after the deity : Astris.

See also 
 Heliades
 Heliadae
 Phaethon

Notes

References
 Nonnus, Dionysiaca; translated by Rouse, W H D, II Books XVI–XXXV. Loeb Classical Library No. 345, Cambridge, MA, Harvard University Press; London, William Heinemann Ltd. 1940. Internet Archive
 Parada, Carlos, Genealogical Guide to Greek Mythology, Jonsered, Paul Åströms Förlag, 1993. .

Nymphs
Children of Helios
Indian characters in Greek mythology